Hebron Lutheran Church is a historic Lutheran church located in the countryside northeast of Madison, Madison County, Virginia. The original section was built about 1740, with the south wing added about 1800.  It is a one-story, "T" shaped, frame building on a stone foundation.  The original section measures 50 feet by 26 feet.  The building was renovated in 1850 and, in 1885, the flat ceilings were adorned with decorative frescoes of rich Victorian patterns by Giuseppe Oddenino.  The building was renovated again in 1961.

It was listed on the National Register of Historic Places in 1971.

In 1802, a new pipe organ made by David Tannenberg, perhaps America's most renowned early builder of pipe organs, was installed in the Hebron Lutheran Church.  As the largest remaining and virtually unaltered example of Tannenberg's or any other extant organs from the colonial period, it is of special importance in American organbuilding history. It, like the church wherein it is located, are special examples of American history.

Pastors

The following pastors have served Hebron Lutheran Church.

 John Caspar Stoever 1733-1739
 George Samuel Klug 1739-1764
 Johannes Schwarbach 1765-1775
 Jacob Frank 1775-1778

References

External links
Hebron Lutheran Church website
The Hebron Lutheran Church Foundation
Hebron Lutheran Church, State Routes 638 & 653, Madison, Madison County, VA: 1 photo, 4 measured drawings, and 17 data pages at Historic American Buildings Survey
Description, photos and sound recordings of the Tannenberg organ in Hebron Lutheran Church, Madison
Descriptive information of Hebron's Tannenberg organ and its restoration in 1970 by George Taylor
Photos of Hebron's Tannenberg organ
Biography

Historic American Buildings Survey in Virginia
Churches on the National Register of Historic Places in Virginia
Lutheran churches in Virginia
Churches completed in 1740
Buildings and structures in Madison County, Virginia
National Register of Historic Places in Madison County, Virginia
1740 establishments in Virginia
18th-century Lutheran churches in the United States